Otto Wladislaus Eduard Konstantin von Garnier (1 May 1858 – 17 June 1947) was a German General of the Cavalry during World War I.

Life and army career 
Otto von Garnier was born in Neustadt in Oberschlesien (currently Prudnik, Poland) as a son of a Prussian, Lieutenant Otto Wladislaus Aloys Joseph Ernst Eduard von Garnier (1830–1908), and his wife Agnes Laurette von Mitzlaff (1837–1914).

On 1 October 1876 von Garnier joined the Husaren-Regiment „Graf Goetzen“ Nr. 6 as a Fahnenjunker. Later, he became a Rittmeister and joined the Großer Generalstab in Berlin. He was promoted to Major on 22 March 1897, and an Oberstleutnant on 11 September 1903.

During World War I he served as a division- and corps-level commander of Imperial German troops. He was in command of 4th Cavalry Division, which was part of the force that moved into neutral Belgium to invest the fortress city of Liege. He was severely wounded at Ciechanów on 21 November 1914. 
In August - September 1915, at the head of the cavalry corps, he led the Sventsyansky breakthrough (Конница в Виленской операции 1915-го). He was awarded with a Pour le Mérite on 17 October 1916. He replaced Erich von Gündell as a commander of V. Reservekorps and Franz von Soden as a commander of VII. Reservekorps. Garnier retired from active duty in March 1918. His daughter Huberta had married General of the Infantry Dietrich von Choltitz.

Awards 

 Order of the Crown (Prussia) (2nd Class)
 Service award
 Order of the Zähringer Lion (1st Class)
 Military Merit Order (Bavaria) (Officer's Cross)
 House and Merit Order of Peter Frederick Louis
 Reußisches Ehrenkreuz
 Albert Order (Komturkreuz II)
 Lippischer Hausorden (3rd Class)
 Order of the Crown (Württemberg) (Ehrenkreuz)
 Order of Orange-Nassau
 Order of Saint Stanislaus (2nd Class)
 Crosses of Military Merit (2nd Class)
 Iron Cross (1st and 2nd Class)
 House Order of Hohenzollern
 Pour Le Merite

References 

1858 births
1947 deaths
People from Prudnik
People from the Province of Silesia
German Army generals of World War I
Recipients of the Pour le Mérite (military class)
Generals of Cavalry (Prussia)
Взаимодействие конницы с конной артиллерией / Битва Гвардий - https://btgv.ru/history/troops-history/%D0%BC%D0%BE%D0%B1%D0%B8%D0%BB%D1%8C%D0%BD%D1%8B%D0%B5-%D0%B2%D0%BE%D0%B9%D1%81%D0%BA%D0%B0-%D0%B2-%D0%B1%D0%BE%D1%8E/interaction-of-cavalry-with-horse-artillery/